Semmelweis Klinikák (Clinics) is a station on the M3 line of the Budapest Metro. It opened on December 31, 1976, as one of the initial six stations of the line, between Deák Ferenc tér and Nagyvárad tér.

From its opening until 6 September 2019, the station was known as Klinikák, meaning clinics. The area around the station is home to several of the medical facilities of Semmelweis University, the city's medical school and one of the largest health care providers. As part of the university's 250th anniversary, the Mayor of Budapest, István Tarlós declared that the station name would change to Semmelweis Klinikák upon completion of the station's renovations.

References  
Budapest City Atlas, Dimap-Szarvas, Budapest, 2011, 

M3 (Budapest Metro) stations
Railway stations opened in 1976